Harold Brooks may refer to:

 Harold E. Brooks (born 1959), American atmospheric scientist
 Tina Brooks (Harold Brooks, 1932–1974), American hard bop tenor saxophonist and composer
 Slicker Parks (1895–1978), American baseball player, who played under the name Harold Brooks

See also
 Harold Brooks-Baker (1933–2005), American-British financier, journalist and publisher, and self-proclaimed expert on genealogy
 Harold Brook (1921–1998), English footballer
 Harry Brooks (disambiguation)